William Conrad Gibbons (September 26, 1926 – July 4, 2015) was an American historian and foreign policy expert.

Life and career
Gibbons was born in 1926 in Harrisonburg, Virginia, to Howard and Jessie Gibbons. He entered the University of Virginia in 1945. His studies were interrupted in order to serve in World War II but he returned to finish his college education at Randolph-Macon College in Ashland, Virginia and was graduated in 1949. Dr. Gibbons went on to earn his Masters and Ph.D. in Government from Princeton University in 1957 and was in the 1954–55 class of the American Political Science Association Congressional Fellowship Program.

He worked in Capitol Hill for both Senator Wayne Morse and Senator Mike Mansfield and also served as an advance man for presidential contender Lyndon B. Johnson in 1960. He was a professional staff member of the Democratic Policy Committee and Assistant to the Majority Leader of the United States Senate (Lyndon B. Johnson followed by Mike Mansfield) from 1960–63.

Gibbons ran for Congress from the Western District of Virginia, which covered his hometown of Harrisonburg but was defeated. He then returned to Washington to work as legislative program staff (1962–63); Deputy Director (1963–65) and Director (1965–68) of Congressional Liaison for the Agency for International Development, Department of State.

At the beginning of the Nixon Administration, William Gibbons left Washington to set up and head the political science department at Texas A&M University. He went on to be a visiting professor at Wellesley College and worked briefly as the Senior Program Officer in charge of all historical activities for the American Revolution Bicentennial Commission. In 1972, Dr. Gibbons became a senior analyst for the Foreign Affairs Division ("FAND") of the Library of Congress, where he stayed for twenty years.

It was as a senior analyst at FAND that he authored the four-volume set entitled "The U.S. Government and the Vietnam War."

The series has been described by historians and journalists as: "By far the best books on the subject" (William Bundy), "The master of Vietnam research" (David Maraniss), "Magisterial" (Brian VanDeMark), "Bill is an overlooked hero...for people like myself, well, just watch how much his name comes up in the footnotes" (Paul Hendrickson), "One of the most valuable studies of the formulation of Vietnam policy during the Kennedy and Johnson administrations" (Stanley Karnow).

This series was a major resource for Robert McNamara's book In Retrospect and for Stanley Karnow's book, Vietnam, A History and his subsequent 26-part PBS series, Vietnam: A Television History. Senator Mansfield and TET, both written by Don Oberdorfer, were greatly aided by the research from the Vietnam series by Gibbons.

In 1980 he became a visiting professor at George Mason University where he continued work on the series. On July 4, 2015, Gibbons died at the age of 88 after a stroke at his farm in Monroe, Virginia.

Papers

(Deposited at the Lyndon B. Johnson Library)

Collection of fifteen linear feet (35 archive boxes) comprising copies of old original documents, being the files of historian William Conrad Gibbons, assembled during the research and writing of his multi-volume scholarly work The U.S. Government and the Vietnam War: Executive and Legislative Roles and Relationships (Princeton University Press).

Filed in chronological order, the documents cover the presidency of Lyndon B. Johnson, from November 1963 to December 1968. The documents are concerned primarily with the background, formulation, and implementation of high-level policy by officials in the White House, the Congress, the State Department, the Defense Department, and the armed forces during the Vietnam War.

The documents were copied at several libraries and repositories across the country, including the Johnson Library, the National Archives, the U.S. Department of State, the U.S. Department of Defense, the U.S. Army Military History Institute, the United States Army Center of Military History.

Publications
The U.S. Government and the Vietnam War: Executive and Legislative Roles and Relationships, Part I, 1945–1961, prepared for the Committee on Foreign Relations, U.S. Senate, by the Congressional Research Service, Senate Print 98-185, Pt. 1 (Washington, D.C.: U.S. Govt. Print. Off., 1984), 365 pp.  

The U.S. Government and the Vietnam War: Executive and Legislative Roles and Relationships, Part II, 1961–1964, prepared for the Committee on Foreign Relations, U.S. Senate, by the Congressional Research Service, Senate Print 98-185, Pt. 2 (Washington, D.C.: U.S. Govt. Print. Off., 1985), 424 pp.  

The U.S. Government and the Vietnam War: Executive and Legislative Roles and Relationships, Part III, December–July 1965, prepared for the Committee on Foreign Relations, U.S. Senate, by the Congressional Research Service, Senate Print 100-163, Pt. 3 (Washington, D.C.: U.S. Govt. Print. Off., 1988), 489 pp.  

The U.S. Government and the Vietnam War: Executive and Legislative Roles and Relationships, Part IV, July 1965-January 1968, prepared for the Committee on Foreign Relations, U.S. Senate, by the Congressional Research Service, Senate Print 100-163, Pt. 4 (Washington, D.C.: U.S. Govt. Print. Off., 19__), __ pp.  

All of the above volumes have also been published by Princeton University Press.

Paper on "Vietnam and the Breakdown of Consensus," for a conference on consensus and foreign policy held by the Miller Center of Public Affairs at the University of Virginia, and published in Richard A. Melanson and Kenneth W. Thompson (Eds.), Foreign Policy and Domestic Consensus (Lanham, Md.: University Press of America, 1985).

Paper on "The Origin of the War Power Provision of the Constitution" for a conference at the State University of New York at Stonybrook honoring Jacob Javits, published in Michael Barnhart (Ed.), Congress and U.S. Foreign Policy (Albany, N.Y.: State University of New York, 1987).

Paper on "The 1965 Decision to Send U.S. Ground Forces to Vietnam," for the Annual Meeting of the International Studies Association, April 16, 1987 in Washington D.C.

External links
Papers of William Conrad Gibbons at the Lyndon B. Johnson Library
Dr. William Conrad Gibbons' website

References

1926 births
2015 deaths
American military personnel of World War II
American military historians
American male non-fiction writers
Historians of the Vietnam War
American political scientists
Princeton University alumni
Library of Congress
George Mason University faculty
Lyndon B. Johnson
People from Harrisonburg, Virginia
People from Monroe, Virginia
Historians from Virginia